Lasiopetalum cardiophyllum, is a species of flowering plant in the family Malvaceae and is endemic to the south-west of Western Australia. It is an erect shrub with egg-shaped to heart-shaped leaves and groups of pinkish flowers.

Description
The upper surfaces of the leaves is more or less glabrous and the lower surface is covered with woolly, grey, star-shaped hairs. Flowering mostly occurs from August to December.

Taxonomy
Lasiopetalum cardiophyllum was first formally described in 1974 by Susan Paust in the journal Nuytsia from specimens collected by Alexander Morrison on Mount Saddleback in 1904. The specific epithet (cardiophyllum) means "heart-leaved".

Distribution and habitat
This lasiopetalum grows on flats and hillslopes between North Bannister and Mount Saddleback in the Avon Wheatbelt and Jarrah Forest biogeographic regions of south-western Western Australia.

Conservation status
Lasiopetalum cardiophyllum is listed as "Priority Four" by the Government of Western Australia Department of Biodiversity, Conservation and Attractions, meaning that is rare or near threatened.

References

cardiophyllum
Malvales of Australia
Flora of Western Australia
Plants described in 1974